Leslie Bridges (14 February 1890 – 6 August 1959) was an English cricketer. He played one first-class match for Cambridge University Cricket Club in 1911.

See also
 List of Cambridge University Cricket Club players

References

External links
 

1890 births
1959 deaths
English cricketers
Cambridge University cricketers
Cricketers from Christchurch